Marijan Vlak (born 23 October 1955) is a Croatian retired football goalkeeper and manager.

Playing career
Born in Petrinja, spent his playing career as a goalkeeper for Dinamo Zagreb and Segesta Sisak. Although he was never capped for the Yugoslavia national football team he was on Miljan Miljanić's broader list for the 1982 FIFA World Cup, but failed to make the final cut.

He won the 1981–82 Yugoslav First League title with Dinamo after beating closest rivals Red Star Belgrade 3-0.

Managerial career
Vlak started his managerial career in 1990.

Honours

Club

Dinamo Zagreb
First Federal League: 1981–82
Marshal Tito Cup: 1982–83

References

External links
 

1955 births
Living people
People from Petrinja
Association football goalkeepers
Yugoslav footballers
GNK Dinamo Zagreb players
HNK Segesta players
Yugoslav First League players
Croatian football managers
GNK Dinamo Zagreb managers
Ferencvárosi TC managers
MŠK Žilina managers
Fehérvár FC managers
Vasas SC managers
NK Slaven Belupo managers
Nemzeti Bajnokság I managers
Croatian expatriate football managers
Expatriate football managers in Slovakia
Croatian expatriate sportspeople in Slovakia
Expatriate football managers in Hungary
Croatian expatriate sportspeople in Hungary